Olav Øby (born 13 October 1994) is a Norwegian football midfielder who currently plays for KR Reykjavík.

He was born in Sarpsborg, and played for Sarpsborg's youth team ahead of the 2011 season. He made his Norwegian Premier League debut on 26 May 2013 against SK Brann; despite not even being considered a part of the senior squad at the time.

Career statistics

References

External links

1994 births
Living people
Norwegian footballers
Norwegian expatriate footballers
Association football midfielders
Sportspeople from Viken (county)
Eliteserien players
Norwegian First Division players
Sarpsborg 08 FF players
Follo FK players
Strømmen IF players
Kristiansund BK players
Kongsvinger IL Toppfotball players
KFUM-Kameratene Oslo players
Fredrikstad FK players
Knattspyrnufélag Reykjavíkur players
People from Sarpsborg
Norwegian expatriate sportspeople in Iceland
Expatriate footballers in Iceland